9700 may refer to:
 The year 9700, in the 10th millennium.
 ATI Radeon 9700, a computer graphics card series
 NVIDIA GeForce 9700, a computer graphics card series